Batatais Futebol Clube, commonly referred to as Batatais, is a Brazilian professional association football club based in Batatais, São Paulo. The team competes in Campeonato Paulista Segunda Divisão, the fourth tier of the São Paulo state football league.

History
The club was founded on 18 September 1919, as Batatais Foot-Ball Club by former members of local club Riachuelo Futebol Clube.

Stadium
Batatais Futebol Clube play their home games at Estádio Doutor Oswaldo Scatena. The stadium has a maximum capacity of 8,540 people.

References

Association football clubs established in 1919
Football clubs in São Paulo (state)
1919 establishments in Brazil